Mortimer Yale Ferris (March 29, 1881, in Brookline, Norfolk County, Massachusetts – March 9, 1941, in Ticonderoga, Essex County, New York) was an American civil engineer and Senator from New York.

Life
He was the son of Dr. Edward Mortimer Ferris and Marion Eliza Yale, daughter of Cyrus Yale. His father graduated from Harvard in medicine. He attended the public schools, and graduated B.Sc. in civil engineering from the Massachusetts Institute of Technology in 1903.

On February 14, 1905, he married Elizabeth Leavitt. They settled in Ticonderoga, New York, and had two daughters. He was President of the Village of Ticonderoga from 1916 to 1918.

Ferris was a member of the New York State Senate (33rd D.) from 1919 to 1926, sitting in the 142nd, 143rd, 144th, 145th, 146th, 147th, 148th and 149th New York State Legislatures. After becoming Senator, he became a member of the New York Republican State Committee, 1927-30; delegate to Republican National Convention from New York, 1928; and chair of Essex County Republican Party, 1930-39.

He was Chairman of the Lake Champlain Bridge Commission which supervised the construction of two bridges over Lake Champlain: the Champlain Bridge from Crown Point, New York, to Chimney Point, Vermont, in 1929; and a second bridge, from Rouses Point, New York, to Alburgh, Vermont, in 1937.

His club memberships included the Freemasons; Scottish Rite Masons; Shriners; Elks; and Sons of the American Revolution.

He died on March 9, 1941, in Ticonderoga, New York, after a long illness.

References

Sources
 CHAMPLAIN BRIDGE OPENS TOMORROW in NYT on August 25, 1929 (subscription required)
 NEW CHAMPLAIN SPAN WILL OPEN ON FRIDAY in NYT on July 11, 1937 (subscription required)
 MORTIMER FERRIS, EX-STATE SENATOR in NYT on March 10, 1941 (subscription required)
 Ferris to Be Buried Tomorrow in The Knickerbocker News, of Albany, New York, on March 10, 1941
 Bio transcribed from The History of New York State by Dr. James Sullivan (1927; Biographies, Part 58)

1881 births
1941 deaths
Republican Party New York (state) state senators
People from Ticonderoga, New York
Politicians from Brookline, Massachusetts
MIT School of Engineering alumni
20th-century American politicians